Kim Tae-gun (Hangul: 김태군; born December 30, 1989, in Busan, South Korea) is a South Korean catcher for the Samsung Lions in the KBO League.

Professional career 
Kim was selected by the LG Twins in the third round of the 2007 KBO Draft out of Busan High School. He was traded to the NC Dinos after the 2012 season. Kim fulfilled his military duties by playing with the Korean Police Baseball Team in 2018–2019. He rejoined the Dinos at the tail-end of the 2019 season.

References

External links 
Career statistics and player information from Korea Baseball Organization

NC Dinos players
LG Twins players
KBO League catchers
South Korean baseball players
1989 births
Living people
Busan High School alumni
Sportspeople from Busan
2017 World Baseball Classic players
South Korean Buddhists